The Secretary for Environment and Ecology of the Hong Kong Government is responsible for environment protection policy in Hong Kong. The position was created most recently in 2007 as the Secretary for the Environment to replace portions of the previous portfolio of Secretary for the Environment, Transport and Works.

On 1 July 2022, the position renamed with the absorption of the food and environmental hygiene portfolio from the Secretary for Food and Health.

The position was renamed various times to include different portfolios, including Secretary for the Environment, Transport and Works, who heads the Environment, Transport and Works Bureau of the Hong Kong Government, responsible for public works projects, transport related issues and environmental protection.

List of office holders
Political party:

Secretaries for the Environment, 1973–1981

Secretaries for Lands and Works, 1981–1989

Secretaries for Planning, Environment and Lands, 1989–1997

Secretaries for Planning, Environment and Lands, 1997–1999

 Planning affairs were handled by the Secretary for Planning and Lands between 2000 and 2002.

Secretaries for the Environment and Food, 2000–2002

Secretaries for the Environment, Transport and Works, 2002–2007

Secretaries for the Environment, 2007–2022

Secretaries for Environment and Ecology, 2022–present

See also
 Public Works Department (Hong Kong)

References

External links
About us
Organisation chart of Hong Kong Government

Environment
Environment ministers